Aldbrough could be the name of two places in England

Aldbrough, East Riding of Yorkshire
Aldbrough St John, North Yorkshire

See also
Aldborough (disambiguation)
Aldeburgh, Suffolk